Meadowbrook Run (also known as Meadow Brook Creek) is a tributary of Ithan Creek in Delaware County, Pennsylvania, in the United States.

Course
Meadowbrook Run begins just south of Conestoga Road near the community of Bryn Mawr, Pennsylvania. It flows southwest for several tenths of a mile before receiving its first tributary, Finn Run, from the left. Shortly thereafter, it begins to parallel Bryn Mawr Avenue and flows into a small pond where it receives Valley Run from the right. Several hundred feet later, it receives Doom Run from the left. Meadowbrook Run then passes under Bryn Mawr Avenue and meets with a small unnamed tributary. The creek flows into Haverford Township, passes under Interstate 476, and reaches its confluence with Ithan Creek.

Meadowbrook Run joins Ithan Creek  upriver of its mouth.

Geography and geology

Watershed
The entire creek is in the United States Geological Survey quadrangle of Norristown. The watershed has several different land uses, including urban residential, retail, college campus (Villanova University), and rural or low density residential. Meadowbrook Run periodically floods during large storm events. The stream is not considered to be impaired.

History
Meadowbrook Run was entered into the Geographic Names Information System on August 2, 1979. Its identifier in the Geographic Names Information System is 1180837.

The Bridge in Radnor Township No. 2 is a brick and concrete arch bridge that spans Meadowbrook Run. The bridge is on the National Register of Historic Places.

In 1986, a development was built on the Willing tract in the Meadowbrook Run watershed. It received local opposition due to the potential of flooding in Meadowbrook Run. However, engineer Theodore J. Gacomis said there would be no runoff problems due to the construction of a retention basin that would release water into the stream at a controlled rate.

See also
List of Pennsylvania rivers

References

Rivers of Delaware County, Pennsylvania
Rivers of Pennsylvania
Tributaries of Darby Creek (Pennsylvania)